Frank Downer Barlow (October 4, 1891 – June 12, 1982) was a Democratic Mississippi state senator, representing the state's 11th senatorial district from 1944 to 1960.

Biography 
Frank Downer Barlow was born on October 4, 1891, in Barlow, Copiah County, Mississippi. He was a cattleman. He first became a member of the Mississippi Senate, representing the 11th senatorial district (Copiah County) as a Democrat, in 1944 for the 1944-1948 term. He was re-elected for the next three terms, serving four terms in total, from 1944 to 1960. He died on June 12, 1982, in the Hardy Wilson Memorial Hospital in Hazlehurst, Mississippi.

References 

1891 births
1982 deaths
Democratic Party Mississippi state senators
People from Crystal Springs, Mississippi